Katlang 2 is a village and union council in Mardan District of Khyber Pakhtunkhwa.

See also
 Katlang 1

References

Union councils of Mardan District
Populated places in Mardan District